Stará Říše is a market town in Jihlava District in the Vysočina Region of the Czech Republic. It has about 600 inhabitants.

Administrative parts
The village of Nepomuky is an administrative part of Stará Říše.

Notable people
Josef Florian (1873–1941), publisher and translator

References

Populated places in Jihlava District
Market towns in the Czech Republic